Sphenella nigricornis is a species of tephritid or fruit flies in the genus Sphenella of the family Tephritidae.

Distribution
Namibia, Lesotho, South Africa.

References

Tephritinae
Insects described in 1924
Taxa named by Mario Bezzi
Diptera of Africa